Michael W. Young (born 1937) is a British anthropologist. His research includes works on Papua New Guinea and history of anthropology.

He lectured at Cambridge University (assistant lecturer, 1970–74) and later at the Australian National University, Canberra (fellow, 1974–83, senior fellow in anthropology, 1983–98, visiting fellow, 1999).

His 2004 book Malinowski: Odyssey of an Anthropologist, 1884–1920 received nominations for the James Tait Black Memorial Prize for Biography and the British Academy Book Prize.

References 

1937 births
British anthropologists
Academic staff of the Australian National University
Living people
Place of birth missing (living people)
Academics of the University of Cambridge